Todd Woodbridge and Helena Suková were the defending champions but lost in the second round to T. J. Middleton and Lori McNeil.

Jonathan Stark and Martina Navratilova defeated Cyril Suk and Gigi Fernández in the final, 6–4, 6–4 to win the mixed doubles tennis title at the 1995 Wimbledon Championships.

Seeds

  Mark Woodforde /  Larisa Neiland (semifinals)
  Grant Connell /  Lindsay Davenport (semifinals)
  Jonathan Stark /  Martina Navratilova (champions)
  Cyril Suk /  Gigi Fernández (final)
  David Adams /  Lisa Raymond  (first round)
  Lan Bale /  Meredith McGrath (first round)
  Patrick Galbraith /  Elna Reinach (first round)
  Andrei Olhovskiy /  Eugenia Maniokova (first round)
  Sandon Stolle /  Mary Joe Fernández (quarterfinals)
  Brett Steven /  Nicole Bradtke (third round)
  John Fitzgerald /  Manon Bollegraf (first round)
  Rick Leach /  Natasha Zvereva (third round)
  Menno Oosting /  Kristie Boogert (second round)
  Murphy Jensen /  Brenda Schultz-McCarthy (second round)
  Greg Van Emburgh /  Nicole Arendt (first round)
  David Macpherson /  Rachel McQuillan (first round)

Draw

Finals

Top half

Section 1

Section 2

Bottom half

Section 3

Section 4

References

External links

1995 Wimbledon Championships on WTAtennis.com
1995 Wimbledon Championships – Doubles draws and results at the International Tennis Federation

X=Mixed Doubles
Wimbledon Championship by year – Mixed doubles